The Church of Scotland Act 1824, sometimes referred to as the Church Building (Scotland) Act 1824, was an Act of the Parliament of the United Kingdom. The whole Act was repealed by the Statute Law (Repeals) Act 1973.

The Act

Amendments 
The preamble and section 1 were wholly repealed by the Statute Law Revision Act 1890. The same Act repealed the words "commissioners of His Majesty's" and "of the United Kingdom of Great Britain and Ireland" from section 2, "his heirs and successors" from section 14, and "the said commissioners of", wherever they occurred, and the words "or any three or more of them for the time being" from section 30.

Section 23 and 24 was repealed by the Church of Scotland (Property and Endowments) Act 1925, in addition to mentions of the payment of stipend in sections 13 and 14.

References

Citations

Notes 

United Kingdom Acts of Parliament 1824
Acts of the Parliament of the United Kingdom concerning Scotland
1824 in Scotland
Church of Scotland